is a Japanese fantasy novel series by Kenichi Kakutani, which is the president of the Kyoto-based company Wakasa Seikatsu. Discover 21 have published two volumes since July 2020 under their Discover Business Publishing imprint. A six-chapter manga adaptation with art by Kumiko Yamaguchi was serialized online via the Wakasa Seikatsu Bookstore website from September 2021 to 2022. It was collected in a single tankōbon volume. An anime film adaptation by Noovo premiered in Kyoto in July 2022.

Characters

Media

Novels

Manga
A six-chapter manga adaptation with art by Kumiko Yamaguchi was serialized online via the Wakasa Seikatsu Bookstore website from September 18, 2021 to 2022. It was collected in a single tankōbon volume.

Anime
An anime adaptation animated by Noovo and directed by Mitsuho Seta was announced on September 18, 2021. It was produced by Yosuke Ito and Kaoru Miyamoto and written by Seta, with Takaaki Nakahashi composing the music. It premiered as a film in Kyoto on July 31, 2022.

References

External links
 

2020 Japanese novels
2022 anime films
Anime and manga based on novels
Anime films based on novels
Book series introduced in 2020
Fantasy anime and manga
Japanese animated fantasy films
Japanese fantasy novels
Japanese webcomics
Kyoto in fiction